The Second Force Reconnaissance Company was the deep reconnaissance/direct action that was assigned to the Fleet Marine Force, Atlantic and its subordinate elements of the Marine Air-Ground Task Force.

Mission

The company augmented active-duty forces or were mobilized to conduct pre-assault and deep post-assault reconnaissance and surveillance in support of Expeditionary Strike Group Two and II Marine Expeditionary Force and its subordinate elements; 22nd, 24th and 26th Marine Expeditionary Units, the 2nd Marine Expeditionary Brigade.

Organization

In 1958, the 2nd FORECON contained a headquarters and service platoon, pathfinder platoon, amphib recon platoon, and a deep recon platoon.

As of 2006, before its deactivation on July 13, 2006, its company table of organization was registered at a full strength of six reconnaissance platoons; one headquarters and service platoon, two direct action platoons, two deep recon platoons, and one scout sniper platoon augmented from 2nd Marine Division's Scout Sniper company.

History

2nd Force Recon Company was formed when the executive officer of 1st Force Recon, Captain Joseph Z. Taylor, took half of the Marines from 1st FORECON and brought them to the east coast to the 2nd Amphibious Reconnaissance Company, located on Marine Corps Base Camp Lejeune, North Carolina.

February 2006, 2nd FORECON Company disbanded. The most experienced operators were selected for the 2nd Marine Special Operations Battalion (2nd MSOB); others either filled the ranks of the 2nd Reconnaissance Battalion under the 2nd Marine Division, forming the Direct Action Platoons (DAP) and the Deep Recon Platoons (DRP). The DAPs and DRPs are established to maintain the direct action/deep recon support to the MAGTFs, for MEF and MEU(SOC) commanders.

Training

Annual Warrior Competition
The 24th MEU 2nd Force Reconnaissance Company won the 2010 Annual Warrior Competition against tactical units from all over the world.

Notes

References

United States Marine Corps Force Reconnaissance
Companies of the United States Marine Corps